Britons, or the British people, are nationals or natives of the United Kingdom of Great Britain and Northern Ireland.

British or Britons may also refer to:

Peoples 
 Celtic Britons or Ancient Britons, Celtic people who inhabited Great Britain from the British Iron Age into the Middle Ages

Individuals 
 William Briton or Breton (died 1356), Breton Franciscan theologian
 Briton Hadden (1898–1929), co-founder and first editor of Time magazine
 Briton Hammon, 18th century slave in British North America who wrote an autobiography published in 1760
 Briton Rivière (1840–1920), British painter

Other uses 
 , various Royal Navy ships
 , a paddle steamer launched in 1862
 Briton Motor Company, a car manufacturer (1909–1919 and 1922–1929) based in Wolverhampton, England
 The Britons, an English antisemitic organization
 Britons, nickname of the Albion College sports teams
 Kaptain Briton, a Marvel Comics alternate version of Captain Britain

See also
 Breton (disambiguation)
 Brit (disambiguation)
 British (disambiguation)
 Britain (disambiguation)